In a House of Lies is the 22nd instalment in the Inspector Rebus series written by Ian Rankin. In a House of Lies entered the hardback chart at No. 1 on the first week of its release.

Plot
Some boys discover a car with a long-dead body in the boot, in a woodland which has been the subject of a real-estate dispute. Rebus, now retired, worked the 2006 missing-persons case, which was, as everyone involved agrees now, badly handled; Rebus himself had tried to protect from publicity the missing man's lover, son of a detective inspector in the old Strathclyde Police, and had also been hoping to tie in 'Big Ger' Cafferty. The murder inquiry now is handled by a team from Police Scotland, but Detective Inspector Siobhan Clarke and Detective Inspector Malcolm Fox are included. Clarke has recently been investigated by a corrupt pair of Anti-Corruption Unit cops for leaking information to a reporter, and she is being harassed by a mysterious person over a recent case which in fact she handled well. Rebus, at her request, re-investigates that case; he tangles with the ACU team, and hopes again to see Cafferty connected to the body-in-the-boot murder.

Rebus is suffering from COPD and has given up cigarettes and almost stopped drinking alcohol. The book gives some attention to modern media and its potential for both public and private bullying.

Background
Ian Rankin has stated that inspiration for the novel in part came from the murder of Daniel Morgan, who was a private detective in South London in the late 1980s. He died of axe wounds to his head in a pub car park in Sydenham, South London in 1987. He was investigating alleged police corruption at the time.

Critical reception
Reception to the book was largely positive; Barry Forshaw, writing in The Guardian said "How has Rankin kept the series fresh for 22 novels? Deft characterisation. Readers must keep up with a lengthy dramatis personae, but there’s nothing wrong with making us work a little." Likewise, Mark Sanderson, writing in the Evening Standard called the book "A brilliantly twisted case for Rebus" and that "..no one in Britain writes better crime novels today." Paul Connolly (The Metro) gave the novel four stars out of five and said that the novel had: 

Julian Cole, writing in the Northern Echo, gave the book four stars out of five, and called it "...[a] good rattling read, let down only by too many unnecessary dialogue modifiers."

References

External links
Ian Rankin being interviewed on BBC Breakfast

2018 British novels
Inspector Rebus novels
Novels set in Scotland
Orion Books books